Minuria is a genus of annuals, perennials and dwarf shrubs in the tribe Astereae within the familyAsteraceae.

 Species
All known species are endemic to Australia.

References

Astereae
Asteraceae genera
Endemic flora of Australia